Olga Manzhuk (born 1 February 1983) is a Belarusian footballer who plays as a midfielder for Belarusian Premier League club Bobruichanka Bobruisk. She has been a member of the Belarus women's national team.

References

1983 births
Living people
Women's association football midfielders
Belarusian women's footballers
People from Malaryta District
Belarus women's international footballers
Belarusian expatriate footballers
Belarusian expatriate sportspeople in Azerbaijan
Expatriate women's footballers in Azerbaijan
Bobruichanka Bobruisk players
Sportspeople from Brest Region